Aubin-Saint-Vaast is a commune in the Pas-de-Calais department in northern France.

Population

Sights
 The church

See also
Communes of Pas-de-Calais

References

Communes of Pas-de-Calais
Artois